Jay Wright may refer to:

Jay Wright (basketball) (born 1961), basketball coach
Jay Wright (poet) (born 1935), winner of the 2005 Bollingen Prize

See also
James Wright (disambiguation)